Rodolfo Vitela Arévalo (born 10 March 1949) is a Mexican former cyclist. He competed in the individual road race and team time trial events at the 1976 Summer Olympics. He won the Vuelta Ciclista a Costa Rica in 1974.

Notes

References

External links
 

1949 births
Living people
Mexican male cyclists
Olympic cyclists of Mexico
Cyclists at the 1976 Summer Olympics
Sportspeople from Michoacán
People from Zacapu
Pan American Games medalists in cycling
Pan American Games gold medalists for Mexico
Medalists at the 1975 Pan American Games